Nath is an Indian surname, commonly found among Bengali Hindus and Assamese Hindus. 'Nath' community belongs to the Yogi-Nath group and are listed as Other Backward Class in West Bengal. Prior to independence, census statistics rarely included the caste name Nath. 19th-century British sources mentioned that castes known as jogis or jugis existed in Bengal, Punjab and Rajputana. The Naths, however, were one of the six subgroups of Jogi in the Rajasthan Hindi census. Some sources claim that Jogis held a low position during the 19th century. They appear to be particularly linked to failed ascetics and weavers who are often of lower status. In Assam, Yogi(nath) were historically known for drumming, now agriculture is their main occupation. In the state of Himachal Pradesh they are classified as Scheduled Caste under India's Reservation system.

Notable people 
 Alka Nath (born 1950), Indian politician
 Alok Nath (born 1956), Indian actor
 Akshdeep Nath (born 1993), Indian cricketer
 Aman Nath (born 1951), Indian writer, hotelier, and architectural restorer
 Avindra Nath (born 1958), Canadian physician-scientist
 Baba Mast Nath (1764–?), Hindu saint
 Bhaskar Nath (born 1984), Indian classical instrumentalist
 Bijoy Nath, Indian cricketer
 Chuon Nath (1883–1969), Cambodian Monk
 David Nath, British television documentary producer and director
 Dhiraj Kumar Nath (1945–2018), Bangladeshi diplomat
 Digvijay Nath (1894–1969), Indian priest
 Dilip Nath (born 1997), Nepalese cricketer
 Jag Mohan Nath, an officer in the Indian Air Force
 K. Nath (born 1945), Indian writer
 Kamal Nath (born 1946), Indian politician
 Karan Nath, Hindi film actor
 Kartar Nath (born 1969), Indian cricketer
 Lalit Chandra Nath (1923–2013), Indian folk dancer
 Lalit Mohan Nath (1935–2016), Bangladeshi nuclear physicist
 Latika Nath, Indian author, photographer and wildlife conservationist
 Mahant Chandnath (1956–2017), Indian politician
 Manoranjan Nath, Indian politician belonging to Communist Party of India (Marxist)
 Manoshi Nath, Indian costume designer
 Michael Nath, British writer and academic
 Nakul Nath (born 1974), Indian politician from the National Congress
 Narender Nath (born 1945), Indian politician from the National Congress
 Narendra Nath (1935–1998), Indian actor
 Nath Pai (1922–1971), Indian freedom fighter, barrister and Member of Parliament from the Praja Socialist Party
 Prem Nath (1916–1992), Indian actor
 Pandit Pran Nath, Indian musician
 Pankaj Nath (born 1966), Bangladesh Awami League politician
 Pran Nath (born 1939), theoretical physicist
 Rahul Nath, Indian actor, choreographer and director
 Raja Dina Nath (1795–1857), Finance Minister in the Punjab Empire
 Rajendra Nath (1932–2008), Nepalese comedian
 Ram Nath (born 1933), Indian historian
 Ratan Lal Nath (born 1995), Indian Politician from Tripura
 Reema Rakesh Nath, Indian film writer 
 Ripon Nath, Bangladeshi audio engineer
 Rumi Nath, Indian politician from the National Congress
 Samarendra Nath (born 1941), Indian cricketer
 Samarjit Nath (born 1981), Indian cricketer
 Sandeep Nath, Indian lyricist, screenwriter
 Sankar Kumar Nath (born 1960), Indian geophysicist
 Shambhu Nath (born 1928), Indian politician from the National Congress
 Sunil Nath, member of the United Liberation Front of Assam
 Vann Nath (1946–2011), Cambodian painter
 Vijay Nath, Fijian politician
 Vikram Nath (born 1962), Indian judge

See also
 
 Debnath

References

Indian surnames